Red Hill is a rural locality in the Western Downs Region, Queensland, Australia.

Geography 
The Chinchilla–Wondai Road passes the south-eastern boundary.

History 

Rosebank State School opened in 1919. It closed circa 1915. It was on the western side at the bend in Holmes Road (approx ).

The locality was officially named and bounded on 27 October 2000.

Education 
There are no schools in Red Hill. The nearest government primary and secondary schools are Chinchilla State School and Chinchilla State High School, both in neighbouring Chinchilla to the south.

References 

Western Downs Region
Localities in Queensland